Maria Reumert Gjerding (born 3 August 1978 in Copenhagen) is a former Danish politician and the current president of the Danish Society for Nature Conservation. She was a member of the Folketing for the Red-Green Alliance political party from 2015 to 2018.

Political career
Gjerding was elected into the parliament of Denmark at the 2015 election where she received 2,287 votes. On 8 April 2018 she resigned her seat, after having been chosen as president of the Danish Society for Nature Conservation. Her seat in parliament was taken over by Øjvind Vilsholm.

References

External links 
 Biography on the website of the Danish Parliament (Folketinget)
 Biography on the website of Danish Society for Nature Conservation

Living people
1978 births
People from Copenhagen
21st-century Danish women politicians
Women members of the Folketing
Red–Green Alliance (Denmark) politicians
Danish conservationists
Members of the Folketing 2015–2019
20th-century Danish women